Port Wakefield Circuit was a motor racing circuit located approximately  east of the town of Port Wakefield in South Australia. It was the first purpose built motor racing facility built in Australia after World War II, and only the second in Australian history. The circuit was created out of necessity in 1953 when two years prior the South Australian state government banned motor racing on public roads, a ban that would stay in place until 1985 when it was rescinded to create the Adelaide Street Circuit for use in the Australian Grand Prix which had become a round of the Formula One World Championship.

Port Wakefield was a small circuit for its time, in an era of three to four mile circuits, the limitations imposed created a circuit of just 1.3 miles (2.092 kilometres). In 1955 the circuit played host to the Australian Grand Prix where Jack Brabham won his first AGP. Brabham's win in his Cooper T40 Bristol was also the first AGP won by a rear-engined car.

When it came to be South Australia's turn to again host the AGP in 1961, the Port Wakefield Circuit was declared inadequate and the 3.38 km (2.1 mi) Mallala Race Circuit was created. With part of Port Wakefield's facilities used to create Mallala, the circuit faded very quickly back into the scrub, though the outline of the circuit is still visible via Google Maps.

The circuit ran clockwise, and started on the Repco Straight. This was followed by a right hand kink before a sharp left turn leading into the right hand TyreSoles Hairpin, the slowest turn on the circuit. A short run south to the right hand Kallin corner led onto the longest (600 metre) straight on the circuit, Thompson Motors Straight. Dunlop corner (turn 5), and Stonyfell (turn 6), led back onto the Repco Straight. Lap times for the circuit were around the 1 minute mark, with Brabham and Reg Hunt (Maserati A6GCM) sharing the fastest lap of the 1955 AGP at 1:03.0.

The last race meeting, organised by the Austin 7 Club of South Australia, was held on 14 May 1961.

References

External links
 Track layout

Australian Grand Prix
Defunct motorsport venues in Australia
1953 establishments in Australia
1961 disestablishments in Australia
Sports venues completed in 1953
Motorsport venues in South Australia